is a Japanese-born, classical and baroque violinist. He is the concertmaster and artistic director of the Netherlands Bach Society since 2018.

Musical activities
Sato started his concert career in the United States at age 12, by winning the Young Concert Artists first prize in 1997, performing throughout North America, Europe, and Japan as a soloist with orchestras such as Baltimore Symphony, Seattle Symphony, National Symphony Orchestra (United States), Minnesota Orchestra, NHK Symphony Orchestra, State Academic Symphony Orchestra of the Russian Federation, Mariinsky Theatre Orchestra, Omsk Academy Symphony Orchestra, Bavarian Radio Symphony Orchestra, Orchestre philharmonique de Radio France, Gulbenkian Orchestra, and Copenhagen Philharmonic.

Sato's New York recital debut in 2000 was quoted as " his concert was a knockout...has developed an astonishing level of poise and musicality" in The New York Times by Allan Kozinn on 24 October 2000.

In 2001, Sato became the youngest artist to perform Beethoven's violin concerto at the Beethoven Festival in Bonn, Germany, which was broadcast through Deutsche Welle.

He was the recipient of a loan by Nippon Music Foundation and a winner of Idemitsu Music Award in 2005 sponsored by Idemitsu Kosan, one of leading oil companies in Japan.

In 2007, as a violist, Sato recorded viola solo sonatas written for Sato by Akira Nishimura for Camerata Tokyo.

Sato was mentored by Chin Kim, Dorothy DeLay and trained and educated by Masao Kawasaki at the Juilliard School, Jaime Laredo at the Curtis Institute, Gérard Poulet at the École Normale de Musique de Paris, Mary Utiger at Hochschule für Musik und Theater München.

As a baroque violinist, he won the Second Prize and the Audience Award at the 17th International Johann Sebastian Bach Competition in Leipzig, Germany in July, 2010.
The Agency for Cultural Affairs of Japan chose Sato to be a recipient of the New Face Prize in Music Division at its 65th Arts Festival based on his Baroque recital which took place in Tokyo on 29 October 2010.

In October 2011, Sato made his UK debut in Cambridge and London with the Academy of Ancient Music under the direction of Richard Egarr, performing Niccolò Paganini's Violin Concerto No. 2 with gut strings on a period instrument. Two years later, in December 2013, Sato performed duo recitals of Mozart's sonatas at the Izumi Hall in Osaka and the Toppan Hall in Tokyo, Japan along with German pianist and harpsichordist Andreas Staier.

In January 2013, Sato was appointed concertmaster of the Netherlands Bach Society Orchestra, succeeding Johannes Leertouwer, as well as of the Concerto Köln. That same month, Sato also received a baroque violin made by Giovanni Grancino around 1695 - on loan from the Jumpstart Jr. Foundation in Amsterdam, Netherlands. About ten months later, in November 2013, the Amsterdam School of the Arts announced their appointment of Sato as a guest teacher to the Early Music Department.

In August 2015, Sato made his Canadian debut in Montreal with the Montreal Symphony Orchestra under the direction of Kent Nagano, performing Johann Sebastian Bach's Violin Concerto No.1 with a period instrument. The live concert was recorded by Radio-Canada and nationally broadcast on Radio-Canada Télé, on ICI ARTV, on Radio-Canada's music network ICI Musique in September 2015, and on medici.tv in October 2015.

In November 2016, performance by Concerto Köln of Antonio Vivaldi's The Four Seasons was recorded live in Kempen, Germany, with Sato as a soloist, and was released by Berlin Classics.

In September 2016, Sato made his Australian debut in Sydney and Melbourne with the Australian Brandenburg Orchestra under direction of Paul Dyer, performing Niccolò Paganini's Violin Concerto No. 4, playing with gut strings. In the tour, Sato directed Felix Mendelssohn's String Symphony No. 3 and Edvard Grieg's Holberg Suite Op. 40. The live concert in Melbourne was recorded and broadcast by ABC Classic FM, and in February 2017 it was released in CD from ABC Classics.

On 11 May 2017, Sato was appointed the 6th artistic director of the Netherlands Bach Society (Nederlandse Bachvereniging) beginning on 1 June 2018, succeeding Jos van Veldhoven.

On 16 April 2019, Sato received the 31st Music Award in Classical Music/Solo Performance by the Japan Music Pen Club.

From 28 September to 6 October 2019, as the 6th artistic director of the Netherlands Bach Society, Sato led a concert tour with the ensemble in Kyoto, Kanagawa, Hiroshima, and Tokyo Japan.

On 1 January 2020, Mainichi Shimbun published the 61st Arts Awards recipients, including Sato, based on his leadership of The Netherlands Bach Society's Japan tour and his J. S. Bach unaccompanied Sonatas and Partitas recitals in Tokyo, Kyoto, Yokohama, Saitama, Hiroshima.

In January 2020, the Record Geijutsu Journal awarded Sato the 57th Record Academy Award Silver Prize, the highest prize as  soloist, highly evaluating his unaccompanied solo works by J. S. Bach (J.S. Bach:Sonatas and Partitas for solo violin from  ACOUSTIC REVIVE).

On 4 Mar 2020, Japanese Agency for Cultural Affairs announced the 76th Ministry of Education, Culture, Sports, Science and Technology Awards in Arts, which recognized Sato as a recipient of the Newcomer Award in Arts.

On 11 December 2020, Sato officially debuted as a conductor at the AVRO TV live televised concert of The Netherlands Bach Society at  TivoliVredenburg in Utrecht, Netherlands.

On 20 December 2020, Sato's disk "12 Fantasias for Solo Violin (Telemann)" was reissued. The first and the limited edition was published on 31 July 2012.

Discography 
Sato has released the following CDs.

* 2005　Eugène Ysaÿe: Six Sonatas for Solo Violin　(Label: Live Notes)
Recorded: August 2004/Released: January 2005
Daily Yomiuri: The Best New CD of the Month (February 2005)
Asahi Shimbun: The Critics' Recommendation (February 2005)
Mainichi Daily News: The Critics' Choice (February 2005)
 Sonata in G minor op.27 no.1
 Sonata in A minor op.27 no.2
 Sonata in D minor "Ballade" op.27 no.3
 Sonata in E minor op.27 no.4
 Sonata in G major op.27 no.5
 Sonata in E major op.27 no.6

* March 2006　Preludes: Favorite Miniatures　(Label: Live Notes)
Recorded: November 2005/Released: March 2006
(composer: see below/ piano: Takashi Sato)
George Gershwin～Heifetz：Three Preludes
 Lili Boulanger：: Nocturne
 Victor Herbert：・À la Valse
 Piotr Tchaikovsky～Auer：Lensky's Aria
 Percy Grainger～Kreisler：Molly on the Shore
 Antonín Dvořák～Kreisler：Songs My Mother Taught Me
 Alfredo D'Ambrosio～Elman：Serenade
 Manuel Ponce～Heifetz：Estrellita
 Jacques Ibert～Heifetz：Le petit âne blanc
 Robert Schumann～Milstein：Abendlied
 Cécile Chaminade～Kreisler：Sérénade espagnole
 Moritz Moszkowski～Sarasate：Guitarre
 Nikolai Rimsky-Korsakov～Kreisler：Chanson arabe
 Felix Winternitz～Kreisler：Dance of the Marionette
 Claude Debussy～Roque：La plus que lente
 Henryk Wieniawski～Kreisler：Caprice in E-flat
 Henryk Wieniawski；Polonaise Brillante

* October 2007　Edvard Grieg: Complete Sonatas for Violin and Piano　(Label: Live Notes)
Recorded: June 2007/Released: October 2007
Grand Prize awarded by the Agency for Cultural Affairs (Government of Japan), 62nd National Arts Festival 2007　
Contents(composer:Edvard Grieg/ piano：Takashi Sato)
 Sonata no.1 in F major, op.8
 Sonata no.2 in G major, op.13
 Sonata no.3 in C minor, op.45

* March 2008　Shunske Sato Plays: Violin and Viola Solo Sonatas by Akira Nishimura　(Label: Camerata)
Recorded: March 2007 /Released: March 2008
Contents:　(composer:Akira Nishimura)
 Sonata No. 1 for violin ('Incantation') (2005)
 Sonata No. 2 for violin ('Trance Medium')(2005)
 Sonata No. 3 for violin ('Characters of flame')(2007)
 Monologue for solo violin (1995)
 Sonata No. 1 for viola ('Whirl dance') (2005)
 Sonata No. 2 for viola ('Mantra on the C string')(2007)
 Fantasia on 'Song of the Birds', for viola (2005)
 Threnody, for viola (1999)

* April 2009　Nicolò Paganini: 24 Caprices, op.1 (world premiere recording on period instrument) (Label: UCJ Japan)
Recorded: January 2009/Released: April 2009
Daily Yomiuri: The Best New CD of the Month (May 2009)
Mainichi Daily News: The Critics' Choice (May 2009)
CD Journal:The Choice of the mouth（May 2009）
Record Geijutsu: The best album of the month（June 2009）
Early Music America Magazine (Volume 17, Number 4, Winter 2011): IN CONCLUSION Hats Off, Gentle People! Is the Revolution Over? (by Anthony Martin) 
Contents(composer: Nicolo Paganini：24 Caprices Op.1)
 Caprice no.1 in E major
 Caprice no.2 in B minor
 Caprice no.3 in E minor
 Caprice no.4 in C minor
 Caprice no.5 in A minor
 Caprice no.6 in G minor
 Caprice no.7 in A minor
 Caprice no.8 in E♭ major
 Caprice no.9 in E major
 Caprice no.10 in G minor
 Caprice no.11 in C major
 Caprice no.12 in A♭ major
 Caprice no.13 in B♭ major
 Caprice no.14 in E♭ major
 Caprice no.15 in E minor
 Caprice no.16 in G minor
 Caprice no.17 in E♭ major
 Caprice no.18 in C major
 Caprice no.19 in E♭ major
 Caprice no.20 in D major
 Caprice no.21 in A major
 Caprice no.22 in F major
 Caprice no.23 in E♭ major
 Caprice no.24 in A minor

* 26 May 2011  Joseph Haydn：『Oxford』、Violin Concerto No.1、Ludwig van Beethoven：Symphony No.2　Hidemi Suzuki＆Orchestra Libera Classica、Shunske Sato (Label:Arte Dell'arco Japan)
Concert Live Recorded: 24 October 2010 / Released: 26 May 2011
Daily Yomiuri: The Recommended New CD of the Month (June 2011)

Contents:
 Haydn：Violin Concerto No.1 in C Major Hob.VIIa:1
 Haydn：Symphony No.92 in G Major Hob.I:92『Oxford』
 Beethoven：Symphony No.2 in D Major op.36

* 31 July 2012　Georg Philipp Telemann: 12 Fantasias for Violin without Bass (Label: Live Notes)
The Record Geijutsu: The Editor's Choice (Oct 2012) 
The Ongakuno Tomo: The Best New Cd of the Month (Sep 2012) 
Recorded: December 2011/Released: 31 July 2012
Daily Yomiuri: The Best New CD of the Month (Aug 2012)
Asahi Shimbun : The Critics' Recommendation (Aug 2012)
CD Journal: Editor's Choice (Sep 2012)

Contents(composer: Georg Philipp Telemann：12 Fantasias for Violin without Bass)
 Fantasia no.1 in B-flat major TWV
 Fantasia no.2 in G major TWV 
 Fantasia no.3 in F minor TWV 
 Fantasia no.4 in D major TWV
 Fantasia no.5 in A major TWV 
 Fantasia no.6 in E minor TWV 
 Fantasia no.7 in E-flat major TWV 
 Fantasia no.8 in E major TWV 
 Fantasia no.9 in B minor TWV 
 Fantasia no.10 in D major TWV
 Fantasia no.11 in F major TWV
 Fantasia no.12 in A minor TWV

* 20 October 2014　Joseph Haydn, Wolfgang Amadeus Mozart, Ludwig van Beethoven: Haydn Symphony No. 67, Mozart Violin Concerto No.1, Beethoven Symphony No.4 Hidemi Suzuki＆Orchestra Libera Classica、Shunske Sato (Label:Arte Dell'arco Japan)

Contents:
 Mozart：Violin Concerto No. 1 in B flat Major K.207
 Haydn：Symphony No.67 in F Major Hob.I-67
 Beethoven：Symphony No.4 in B flat Major op.60

* 18 November 2016　Antonio Vivaldi: The Four Seasons Concerto Köln & Shunske Sato (Berlin Classics Germany)

The Best Classical Music Album of the year by Deutschlandradio

The Best Classical Album of the year by Junge Weld

Contents:
 Concerto No. 1 in E major The Four Seasons: Spring Op. 8, No.1 RV 269
 Concerto No. 2 in G minor The Four Seasons: Summer Op. 8, No.2 RV 315
 Concerto No. 3 in F major The Four Seasons: Autumn Op. 8, No.3 RV 293
 Concerto No. 4 in F minor The Four Seasons: Winter Op. 8, No.4 RV 297

* 3 February 2017　The Romantics - Grieg | Mendelssohn | Paganini Australian Brandenburg Orchestra & Shunske Sato (Label:ABC Classics Australia)

Contents:
 EDVARD GRIEG: From Holberg's Time – Suite in the Olden Style
 FELIX MENDELSSOHN: String Symphony No. 3 in E minor
 NICCOLÒ PAGANINI: Violin Concerto No. 4 in D minor

* 26 October 2018　Bach: Violin Concertos Shunske Sato, Il Pomo d'Oro (orchestra), Zefira Valova (Label:Rhino Warner Classics)
The Record Geijutsu: The Editor's Choice The best album of the month (Dec 2018) 
Gramophone: Editor's Choice (Jan 2019)

Contents:
 J. S. Bach: Violin Concerto No. 1 in A minor BWV1041
 J. S. Bach: Violin Concerto No. 2 in E Major BWV1042
 J. S. Bach: Concerto for Two Violins in D minor BWV1043
 J. S. Bach: Violin Concerto No. 5 in G minor (Arr. Forkel) BWV1056R

* 7 May 2019　Étienne Méhul, Ludwig van Beethoven, Joseph Haydn: Méhul Opera "Stratonice" Overture, Beethoven Violin Concerto, Haydn Symphony No.94 Hob.I:94 "Surprise" Hidemi Suzuki＆Orchestra Libera Classica、Shunske Sato (Label:Arte Dell'arco Japan)

Contents:
 Méhul：Opera "Stratonice" Overture
 Beethoven：Violin Concerto in D Major op.61
 Haydn：Symphony No.94 in G Major Hob.I-94 "Surprise"

The Record Geijutsu: The Editor's Choice (Aug 2019) 
The Asahi Shimbun : The Critics' Recommendation (Jul 2019)

* 1 Aug 2019　Johann Sebastian Bach: J.S.Bach: Sonatas and Partitas for solo violin / Shunsuke Sato (Label: ACOUSTIC REVIVE)
Recorded: 1–4 May, 31, 2 June 2017/Released: 1 August 2019

Contents(composer: Johann Sebastian Bach：Sonatas and Partitas for solo violin
 Sonata no.1 in G minor BWV1001
 Partita no.1 in B minor BWV1002 
 Sonata no.2 in A minor BWV1003 
 Partita no.2 in D minor BWV1004
 Sonata no.3 in C major BWV1005 
 Partita no.3 in E major BWV1006

The Record Geijutsu: The Editor's Choice The best album of the month (Nov 2019) 
The Ongakuno Tomo: The Best New Cd of the Month (Nov 2012) 
Asahi Shimbun: For Your Collection Classic The Best Disc (17 October 2019)
Daily Yomiuri: The Best New CD of the Month (17 October 2019)
CD Journal: The Choice of the Month (27 August 2019)

 28 August 2020, Concertos 4 Violins  Concerto Köln, Shunske Sato, Mayumi Hirasaki, Evgeny Sviridov, Jesús Merino-Ruiz.　(Label:Berlin Classics　Germany)
 Vivaldi：Violin Concerto in B minor Op.3-10 RV580
 Bonporti：Violin Concerto in E major Op.11ー９　
 Vivaldi：Violin Concerto in D major Op.3−１RV549
 Valentini：Violin Concerto in A minor Op.7−11
 Castrucci：Violin Concerto in G minor Op.3−6
 Locatelli：Violin Concerto in F major Op.4−12

* 20 December 2020 Georg Philipp Telemann: 12 Fantasias for Violin without Bass (Reissued Edition Label:Live Notes Japan)
Contents(composer: Georg Philipp Telemann：12 Fantasias for Violin without Bass)
 Fantasia no.1 in B-flat major TWV
 Fantasia no.2 in G major TWV 
 Fantasia no.3 in F minor TWV 
 Fantasia no.4 in D major TWV
 Fantasia no.5 in A major TWV 
 Fantasia no.6 in E minor TWV 
 Fantasia no.7 in E-flat major TWV 
 Fantasia no.8 in E major TWV 
 Fantasia no.9 in B minor TWV 
 Fantasia no.10 in D major TWV
 Fantasia no.11 in F major TWV
 Fantasia no.12 in A minor TWV

References

External links

 Shunske Sato Official website
 Facebook Official Page
  profile at Universal Music Japan
  biography at The Violin Site : Resource for Violinists 
  biography at KAJIMOTO 
  biography at Musicaglotz
  2010 Ditto Festival (Korea) for beginners of classical music Korean-Drama Guide 22 June 2010
 Nicolò Paganini Discography (UK) compiled by Peter Snedden see April 2009 
Corelli Violin Sonata with Shunske Sato and Richard Egarr (UK) complied by the Academy of Ancient Music 2011 
Shunske Sato on Paganini (UK) complied by the Academy of Ancient Music 2011 
 "Voyez l’Orchestre symphonique de Montréal et Kent Nagano en concert sur ICI Musique" ICI Musique Canada
Kent Nagano conducts Bach and Respighi with Shunske Sato medici.tv 
Brandenburg Concerto No.4 in G major BWV1049 All of Bach presented by Netherlands' Bach Society 
Concerto Köln "The Four Seasons" Berlin Classics  

Baroque-violin players
Central High School (Philadelphia) alumni
Japanese classical violinists
Juilliard School alumni
Musicians from Philadelphia
1984 births
Living people
21st-century classical violinists